Al-Rutba Sport Club, is an Iraqi football team based in Ar-Rutbah, Al-Anbar, that plays in Iraq Division Three.

Managerial history
 Asaad Ibrahim

See also 
 2021–22 Iraq FA Cup

References

External links
 Al-Rutba SC on Goalzz.com
 Iraq Clubs- Foundation Dates

1985 establishments in Iraq
Association football clubs established in 1985
Football clubs in Al-Anbar